Aubrey Howard Fabian (20 March 1909 – 26 September 1984) was an English amateur sportsman who played both football and cricket.

Early life
Born in East Finchley, Fabian attended Highgate School and earned a blue at Cambridge at both football and cricket.

Career

Football career
Fabian made regular appearances for amateur teams Corinthian and Casuals throughout the 1930s. He played in Casuals 1936 FA Amateur Cup Final winning team and is in the top 20 Casuals all time appearance makers. In 1939, he joined the newly merged team of Corinthian-Casuals and played for Old Cholmeleians, the 'Old Boys Team' of Highgate School; he also earned six caps for the England amateurs.

Fabian also played in the Football League for Derby County, joining them from Cambridge University in December 1931, and making his debut on 20 February 1932. He made a total of 12 appearances in the Football League for Derby County, scoring 1 goal; he also scored 2 goals in 4 FA Cup matches for them. His final appearance for Derby County was on 22 April 1933. In the 1934–35 season he was registered with Fulham.

Cricket career

Fabian was as a slow-medium bowler and played three seasons of first-class cricket for Cambridge University between 1929 and 1931, including the Varsity Match at Lord's each year. His best figures were 8–69 against Yorkshire in 1930.

Eton Fives
Fabian was also an accomplished Eton Fives player, winning the Kinnaird Cup – the National Amateur Championships – four times, in 1930 with Javier Aguirre and in 1937, 1939 and 1948 with John Webb.

References

1909 births
1984 deaths
English footballers
England amateur international footballers
Association football inside forwards
Corinthian F.C. players
Casuals F.C. players
Corinthian-Casuals F.C. players
Cambridge University A.F.C. players
Derby County F.C. players
English Football League players
English cricketers
Cambridge University cricketers
Fulham F.C. players